The 10th Guldbagge Awards ceremony, presented by the Swedish Film Institute, honored the best Swedish films of 1973 and 1974, and took place on 16 September 1974. A Handful of Love directed by Vilgot Sjöman was presented with the award for Best Film.

Awards
 Best Film: A Handful of Love by Vilgot Sjöman
 Best Director: Vilgot Sjöman for A Handful of Love
 Best Actor: Allan Edwall for Emil and the Piglet
 Best Actress: Inga Tidblad for Pistol
 Special Achievement: P. A. Lundgren for A Handful of Love

References

External links
Official website
Guldbaggen on Facebook
Guldbaggen on Twitter
10th Guldbagge Awards at Internet Movie Database

1974 in Sweden
1974 film awards
Guldbagge Awards ceremonies
September 1974 events in Europe
1970s in Stockholm